Pearly Gates! is an independent record label and musicians' community based in New York City. Active members include Gregory and the Hawk, Short Stories, The Boys and Girls Club, Scott Thorough and Royal Family.

Releases

External links
 Pearly Gates! on Myspace

American independent record labels